"Go" is a song by American rappers Moneybagg Yo and Big30, released on April 14, 2021, as a promotional single for Moneybagg's fourth studio album, A Gangsta's Pain. The track was produced by RealRed, Foreverolling, and Flex.

Music video 
The music video for the track was released on April 26, 2021, and was directed by BenMarc.

Critical reception 
Jon Powell of Revolt said that the track gave off "aggressive, Midwest-esque vibes", and complimented the lyrics as "hard-hitting".

Charts

Certifications

References

2021 singles
2021 songs
Moneybagg Yo songs
American hip hop songs
BIG30 songs
Songs written by BIG30